Leandro "Léo" Ferreira Medeiros (born May 14, 1981 in Recreio), is a Brazilian retired defensive midfielder, and the current assistant manager of Valeriodoce.

Career
Léo Medeiros is a midfielder who was successful in Ipatinga ease of play as attacking midfielder, and without the ball as wheel being used well in the scheme of coach Ney Franco, both in mining and in the club Flamengo.

It has come to Fla in the middle of 2006, along with Walter Minhoca and Diego da Silva, also from Jaipur and was the only remaining trio for the year 2007. Working with the Holy Mantle, Medeiros pointed up some goals, but had a very irregular and she alternated changeover good performances in matches and not so inspired.

In 2008, considered disposable by Joel Santana, Leo was on loan at Atlético Paranaense prompted by Ney Franco that this time the team trained Paraná. Failing to keep good performances, the player was still far from the starting lineup at midseason, however, remained on the coaching staff of Curitiba.

In 2009, again dismissed by the coaches, the player was loaned again, this time in Bahia. Bahia arrived at the team carrying the status and salary of crack, about $50 000, resumed between Fla and Bahia. He played the best matches of the club from Salvador in the first half, but still not pleased the coach Gallo, still at the beginning of the Brazilian Championship, asked her head and put him to train separately.

By luck or chance, Medeiros saw soon after the coach and disaffection, Gallo, be dismissed. So it was then reinstated to the team by new coach Bahia, Paulo Comelli. Though reinstated, Léo Medeiros was no more consensus in Bahia and was eventually released as soon as that team finished the season.

In 2010, he presented himself again to Most Wanted from Brazil to perform the pre-season and was eventually reinstated to the first team squad games Cariocão. But the player did not take the chance offered by then-coach Andrade, who used improvised on the left back and ended up forgotten in the red-black cast.

In the year 2014, and hung up the boots, the Nacional de Muriaé and in 2015, assumes another function, now out of the four lines being technical assistant of Valeriodoce.

Flamengo career statistics
(Correct  January 17, 2010)

according to combined sources on the Flamengo official website and Flaestatística.

Honours
 Minas Gerais State League: 2005
 Taça Guanabara: 2007, 2008
 Rio de Janeiro State League: 2007

Contract
 Flamengo 3 January 2008 to 31 December 2010
 Ipatinga until 31 December 2011

References

External links
 CBF
 sambafoot
 zerozero.pt
 soccerterminal
 Guardian Stats Centre

1981 births
Brazilian footballers
Campeonato Brasileiro Série A players
Campeonato Brasileiro Série B players
Campeonato Brasileiro Série C players
Cruzeiro Esporte Clube players
Ipatinga Futebol Clube players
Ceará Sporting Club players
Sociedade Esportiva do Gama players
CR Flamengo footballers
Club Athletico Paranaense players
Esporte Clube Bahia players
Grêmio Esportivo Brasil players
Clube do Remo players
Esporte Clube Rio Verde players
Living people
Association football midfielders